Thomas J. Schueller (born 1956) is a former Iowa State Representative.  A Democrat, he served in the Iowa House of Representatives from 2005 to 2011, representing the 25th District.

During his last term in the Iowa House, Schueller served on several committees in the Iowa House - the Economic Growth, Local Government, and WAys and Means committees.  He also served as chair of the Rebuild Iowa and Disaster Recovery Committee and as a member of the Economic Development Appropriations Subcommittee.

Electoral history
*incumbent

References

External links

 Representative Tom J. Schueller official Iowa General Assembly site
Tom Schueller State Representative official constituency site
 

Democratic Party members of the Iowa House of Representatives
Living people
Place of birth missing (living people)
1956 births